Al-Asas ('The Foundation') was a daily newspaper brought out by the Iraqi Communist Party. The newspaper was founded in 1948. A well-known lawyer and communist leader, Sharif ash-Sheikh, served as the editor of the newspaper. Al-Asas was closed down by the authorities soon after it was launched.

References

1948 establishments in Iraq
Arabic communist newspapers
Arabic-language newspapers
Communist newspapers published in Iraq
Defunct newspapers published in Iraq
Iraqi Communist Party
Publications established in 1948
Publications with year of disestablishment missing